The 1956 New South Wales Road Racing Championship for Racing Cars was a motor race  held at the Mount Panorama Circuit, Bathurst, New South Wales, Australia on 1 October 1956. The race utilised a handicap format with the first car, the MG TF of Barry Topen, scheduled to start 18 minutes and 12 seconds before the last car, the Maserati 250F of Stan Jones. The championship was awarded to the driver setting the fastest time for the event, regardless of handicap result.

The championship was won by Stan Jones driving a Maserati 250F.

Results

Notes
 Attendance: 8-10,000
 Fastest Lap: Stan Jones (Maserati 250F), 2:44.4, 85.9 m.p.h., (new lap record)

References

New South Wales Road Racing Championship for Racing Cars
Motorsport in Bathurst, New South Wales